Honeychurch is a surname. Notable people with the surname include:

Cara Honeychurch, Australian ten-pin bowling player
Klint Honeychurch, American video game designer
Lucy Honeychurch, fictional character in E. M. Forster's 1908 novel A Room with a View
Marlyse Honeychurch, victim of the Bear Brook murders
Mitch Honeychurch (born 1995), Australian rules footballer

See also
Honychurch